Jonas Ems (born 26 August 1986) is a German sprint canoer who has competed since the mid-2000s. He has won four medals at the ICF Canoe Sprint World Championships with a gold (K-1 200 m: 2007), two silvers (K-1 4 × 200 m: 2009, K-4 200 m: 2005) and a bronze (K-2 200 m: 2013).

Ems also competed at the 2008 Summer Olympics in Beijing in the K-1 500 m event, but was eliminated in the semifinals.  At the 2012 Summer Olympics, he and Ronald Rauhe reached the final of the K-2 200 m event.

References

1986 births
Canoeists at the 2008 Summer Olympics
Canoeists at the 2012 Summer Olympics
German male canoeists
Living people
Olympic canoeists of Germany
ICF Canoe Sprint World Championships medalists in kayak
Sportspeople from Hamm